Sanger is an unincorporated community in Fayette County, West Virginia, United States.

The community was named after Henry Sanger, an early settler.

References 

Unincorporated communities in West Virginia
Unincorporated communities in Fayette County, West Virginia